The 1910 California gubernatorial election was held on November 8, 1910. Hiram Johnson had defeated Charles F. Curry and Alden Anderson for the Republican nomination.

General election results

References
 Our Campaigns

California
1910
Gubernatorial
November 1910 events